Chongqing University (CQU; , colloquially abbreviated as ChóngDà) is a public research university located in Chongqing, China. It is a National Key University directly funded by the central government of China as part of the Double First Class University Plan, Project 211 and Project 985 and a member of the "Excellence League". It is also designated by the Chinese Ministry of Education as a Class A Double First Class University.

Chongqing University is especially highly recognized in Architecture, Electrical Engineering, Civil Engineering, Mechanical Engineering, Metallurgical Engineering, and Management Science. According to Academic Ranking of World Universities 2021, CQU is ranked 201-300 in the world.

History

Chongqing University was founded in 1929, when some professors born in Chongqing, working at Chengdu University, decided to found a new University in Chongqing. The university was founded with the help of General Liu Xiang, whose involvement resulted in the founding of the Chongqing University Preparatory Committee. On October 12, the first term of Chongqing University began, and the Chongqing University Preparatory Committee published the "Chongqing University Founding Declaration", which declared talents and education to be the driving force of the country and the world's development.

In 1937, the Capital Nanjing was occupied. the Chinese government ordered that all agencies move to Chongqing and continue resisting Japanese aggression. This order resulted in the relocation of the National Central University to Chongqing, where it was gifted 200mu of land by the Chongqing University, and a cooperative relationship was established between the two universities. Many distinguished professors taught at the two universities during third period, including Li Siguang, Xu Beihong, Wu Guanzhong, Ma Yinchu, He Lu, and Lu Zuofu.

In 1942, Chongqing University became a national comprehensive university consisting of six colleges in liberal arts, science, engineering, law, and medicine.

In 1952, the nationwide restructuring of higher education turned Chongqing University into an engineering-orientated multi-disciplinary university under the State Ministry of Education. In 1960, Chongqing University was designated as one of the first key national universities. Since the implementation of reform and opening-up policy in China, Chongqing University has stressed the development of disciplines like humanities, business management, art, and sports education, and has further sped up the process of developing the university into a comprehensive institution of higher learning.

Present

Chongqing University has 28 schools plus the graduate school, the City College of Science and Technology, the College of Continuing Education, and the College of Online Education. The university now has a total enrollment of 50,000 students, of which 20,000 are master's and doctoral students, and 30,000 are undergraduate students. The university owns 24 mobile workstations for postdoctoral study, 133 doctoral programs, 256 master programs, 18 professional master's degree programs, namely MBA, EMBA, MPA, master of engineering, and 89 bachelor's degree programs in 8 academic categories of science, engineering, liberal arts, economics, management, law, agriculture and education.

Currently, the university has a total number of 5,400 faculty and staff members, including 2,700 full-time faculty, 3 members of the Chinese Academy of Engineering, 12 contracted members from other institutions, 6 members of the Subject Evaluation Team of the Academic Degree Committee under the State Council, 4 chief scientists of National 973 Projects, 4 state-level "young experts with distinguished contribution", 500 doctorate supervisors, 1,700 full professors and associate professors.

Chongqing University covers a total area of 5,500 mu (about 178 hectares), with 1.60 million square meters of construction space.  In 2001, Chongqing University Technology Park came into being, as one of the 22 state-level university technology parks in China.

Academics

Academic organisation
Faculty of Arts and Sciences
 Institute for Advanced Studies in Humanities and Social Sciences
 Liberal Arts College
 School of Economics and Business Administration
 School of Public Affairs
 School of Foreign Language
 School of Arts
 School of Journalism and Communication
 Law School
 Meishi Film Academy 
 School of Chemistry and Chemical Engineering
 School of Bioengineering 
 School of Physics 
 School of Mathematics and Statistics 
 School of Physical Education 
 School of Life Sciences

Faculty of the Built Environment
 School of Architecture and Urban Planning
 School of Civil Engineering
 School of Urban Construction and Environmental Engineering
 School of Construction Management and Real Estate

Faculty of Engineering
 School of Mechanical Engineering 
 School of Electrical Engineering
 School of Power and Energy Engineering
 School of Material Science and Engineering
 School of Resources and Environmental Science
 School of Aerospace Engineering
 Chongqing University and University of Cincinnati Joint Cooperative Institute(JCI)

Faculty of Information Science and Technology
 School of Computer Science
 School of Automation
 School of Communication Engineering
 School of Opto-Electronic Engineering
 School of Software Engineering

Other
 International School (College of International Education) 
 City College of Science and Technology
 College of Continuing Education
 College of Networking Education

Teaching and research
Chongqing University is in possession of 17 state key subjects and 14 key subjects under the state "211 Project", 38 provincial or ministerial key subjects. The university sets up 14 specially appointed professor posts under the "Yangtze River Scholar Award Program". It has established 3 national teaching bases for fundamental courses and a national quality education base for college students, 9 national key labs and ministerial key labs, 71 provincial key labs, and 130 labs of different specialties. Moreover, Chongqing University has constructed the distance education center, multi-media classrooms of large scale and interactive audio-visual classrooms, labs or training centers in cooperation with world-famous enterprises such as Siemens, Microsoft, IBM, Rockwell, Omron, etc. The university has a national key publishing house, a national first-class architectural designing institute, and a first-class institute for planning and design.

In recent years, the university has undertaken over 100 national key scientific projects of different types, and won 13 National Awards for Invention, 40 Awards for Scientific and Technological Advancement, 4 Awards for Natural Science, 968 ministerial and provincial awards, 283 Awards for Teaching Achievement.

Rankings

Top ranked disciplines in China

Library collections

The university library is well equipped with modern facilities and a collection of 3.90 million volumes, 6000 kinds of Chinese and foreign periodicals, and 2.0 million volumes of E-books. In addition it has 5 electronic reading rooms with 65,000 e-books and journals. The China Education Research Network (CERNET) Chongqing Central Node is set up in the library.

Key laboratories

State Key Laboratories(Engineering Centers)
 Mechanical Transmission
 Power Transmission and Distribution Equipment and Systems Safety, and New Technology
 Tech R&D Center for Magnesium Alloy Engineering
 New Micro-Nano Devices and System Technology
 International R&D Center for Micro-Nano System and New Materials Technology
 
Key Laboratories of the Ministry of Education of China
 Opto-electronic Technology and Systems
 China Southwest Resource Exploitation and Environmental Disaster Control Engineering
 The Three Gorges Reservoir Region's Eco-Environment
 Center for Supervising, Inspecting and Testing Transgenic Biological Product Ingredients
 Upland Urban Construction and New Technology (under construction)
 Center for Industrial CT Non-destructive testing Engineering (under construction)
 
Discipline Innovation Bases for Higher 
 Education("111 Project")
 Innovative Base of Biological Mechanics and Tissue-Repair Engineering
 Innovative Base of Power Transforming and Transmission Equipments and System Safety Technology

Provincial Key Laboratories
 Manufacturing System Engineering
 High Voltage Technology and System Information Monitoring
 Biomedical Engineering
 Metallurgical Engineering
 New Technology in Electrical Engineering
 Software Engineering
 Exploitation of Mineral Resources and Environmental Damages and Engineering Disasters in the Three Gorges Reservoir Region
 Automation Engineering
 Thermal Engineering
 Rock and Soil Engineering
 Material Physics Building Environment and Installation Engineering
 Carrier Test and Monitoring and Remote Sensing Information Transmission Technology
 New Building Materials and Engineering
 Pollution Prevention and Waste Recycling Architectural Technology
 Municipal and Environment Engineering

Campus
Chongqing University covers a total area of over 3.65 square kilometres, consisting of four campuses. With green mountains surrounded and the Jialing River flowing by, the four campuses are set amidst delightful sceneries and awarded the title of “Garden University” by Chongqing Municipality.

Outreach and cooperation
It has established inter-university exchange links with over 100 institutions of higher education in 20 countries such as the USA, England, France, Germany, Italy, Canada, Australia, the Netherlands, Japan, South Korea, Russia, etc.

Alumni
Chongqing University has many notable alumni including:
Ren Zhengfei, Founder and President of Huawei
Li Xiaohong, President of Chinese Academy of Engineering (CAE) and President of Wuhan University
Xu Xiangu, Engineering Professor
Fang Paidi, Actor and Film Director
Qian Rongkun, Economist
Yang Mingzhao, Poet
Yan Su, Lyricist
Chou Wen-chung, Chinese-American Composer of Contemporary Classical Music

See also
 Meishi Film Academy

References

External links
Chongqing University official website 

Chongqing University
1929 establishments in China
Educational institutions established in 1929
Project 211
Project 985
Universities and colleges in Chongqing
Vice-ministerial universities in China